Željko Kalajdžić (Serbian Cyrillic: Жељко Калајџић; born 11 May 1978) is a Serbian professional football coach and former professional footballer.

External links
 
 
 Superleague Greece profile
 

1978 births
Living people
Footballers from Belgrade
Serbian footballers
Association football midfielders
FK Hajduk Beograd players
FK Zemun players
Villarreal CF players
CD Logroñés footballers
FK Voždovac players
Incheon United FC players
Kavala F.C. players
OFI Crete F.C. players
Segunda División players
Serbian SuperLiga players
K League 1 players
Super League Greece players
Serbian expatriate footballers
Expatriate footballers in Spain
Expatriate footballers in South Korea
Expatriate footballers in Greece
Panachaiki F.C. managers